Captain Fathom is an animated television series produced in 1965 by Cambria Studios. Like Cambria's other productions, Clutch Cargo and Space Angel, it was produced in Synchro-Vox. At least 26 30-minute episodes, all in color, were filmed. The episodes could be broken down into five 5-minute segments in cliffhanger format. Renowned comic book artist Alex Toth was the director.

This animated series was broadcast in Italy in syndication in the early 1980s under two different titles: Avventure negli abissi (that means in English Adventures in the Abyss) and Captain Fathom. This was the last Cambria Studios cartoon show to use the Syncro-Vox.

An attempt at airing a live-action version of Captain Fathom was done in 1955 starring Don Megowan, Richard H. Cutting, and Barbara Wilson. The pilot wasn't purchased by a network and was never aired.

Plot
Captain Bill Fathom was captain of a submarine called the Argonaut. He and his crew would have various adventures, similar to those of Clutch Cargo or Jonny Quest.

Episodes
A Man Called Guppy
The Loss of the Argonaut (episodes 5-10)
Mission: Thunder Fire Island (episodes 11-15)
One for the Money, One for the Show
The Ice Trap (episodes 31-35)
Wanted Dead or Alive
The Light That Wailed
The Underseas Land Grab
The Shrieking Mountain (episodes 46-50)
Find a Hidden Prize (episodes 51-55)
The Pirates of Global Island
Pursuit of the Dinopisces
The Sub-Enchanted Garden (episodes 71-75)
Rustlers of the Sea Range (episodes 76-80)
Voyage to the Stone Age (episodes 81-85)
The Baron of Shark Island (episodes 86-90)
Ghost Ship (episodes 91-95)
The Whale and W.P. (episodes 96-100)
The Eye of the Mountain (episodes 111-115)
Xerog (episodes 116-120)
Project Meec
Phantom of Port Royal
Seldom Seem Sea Serpent
Deep Marauder
U-2 Rudolph
Pisastro's Private War (episodes 171-175)

References

External links
Captain Fathom at Don Markstein's Toonopedia. Archived from the original on April 9, 2012.

1965 American television series debuts
1965 American television series endings
1960s American animated television series
American children's animated adventure television series
First-run syndicated television programs in the United States
Television series by Cambria Productions